Harry Jerome Rogers (born December 31, 1950) is an American former basketball player. He played college basketball for Saint Louis, before turning professional and starting his career in the Netherlands.

He attended Sumner High School in St. Louis, Missouri. Rogers was inducted into the Missouri Sports Hall of Fame in 1991.

Rogers was drafted by the Milwaukee Bucks in the fourth round of the 1973 NBA Draft. He signed with Punch of the Dutch Eredivisie in 1974 and stayed for three seasons. He averaged 23.6 points in his total of 57 games and helped Punch win the 1975 national championship. He also won the Eredivisie's inaugural Most Valuable Player award in 1974–75 after averaging 24.3 points over the season.

Rogers played for the Spirits of St. Louis of the American Basketball Association (ABA) in 1975.

References

1950 births
Living people
American expatriate basketball people in the Netherlands
American men's basketball players
Basketball players from St. Louis
Milwaukee Bucks draft picks
Power forwards (basketball)
Saint Louis Billikens men's basketball players
Spirits of St. Louis players

DSBV Punch players